is a passenger railway station located in the city of Kuwana, Mie Prefecture, Japan, operated by the private railway operator Sangi Railway.

Lines
Umamichi Station is served by the Hokusei Line, and is located 1.1 kilometres from the terminus of the line at Nishi-Kuwana Station.

Layout
The station consists of two unnumbered opposed side platforms connected by a level crossing. The station is unattended.

Platforms

Adjacent stations

History
Umamichi Station was opened on April 5, 1914 as a station on the Hokusei Railway, which became the Hokusei Electric Railway on June 27, 1934. Through a series of mergers, the line became part of the Kintetsu network by April 1, 1965, but was spun out as an independent company on April 1, 2003.

Passenger statistics
In fiscal 2019, the station was used by an average of 250 passengers daily (boarding passengers only).

Surrounding area
Kuwana High School
Kuwana Umamichi Post Office

See also
List of railway stations in Japan

References

External links

Sangi Railway official home page

Railway stations in Japan opened in 1914
Railway stations in Mie Prefecture
Kuwana, Mie